"The One" is a song recorded by The Chainsmokers for their debut studio album Memories...Do Not Open (2017). The song was released as the first promotional single from the album on March 27, 2017. It was co-written with frequent collaborators Scott Harris and Emily Warren.

Background 
The tempo was slower in this song, compared to The Chainsmokers' previous songs. It is sung by Andrew Taggart. YourEDM described the song as a mellow track that "begins with ballad and slightly drops into EDM at the climax, as the bass kicks in". MTV described it as a "heavyhearted breakup song".

Charts

Weekly charts

Year-end charts

Certifications

References 

The Chainsmokers songs
2017 singles
2017 songs
American pop songs
Electronic songs
Songs written by Emily Warren
Songs written by Scott Harris (songwriter)
Songs written by Andrew Taggart
Disruptor Records singles